Tanuševci is a village in the municipality of Čučer-Sandevo, Republic of North Macedonia.

Name 
The name comes from the Albanian name Tanush.

Demographics
As of the 2021 census, Tanuševci had 304 residents with the following ethnic composition:
Albanians 212
Persons for whom data are taken from administrative sources 92

According to the 2002 census, the village had a total of 417 inhabitants. Ethnic groups in the village include:
Albanians 409
Others 8

See also 
Tanush (name)

References

External links

Villages in Čučer-Sandevo Municipality
Albanian communities in North Macedonia